Exploratory may refer to:

Exploration, the act of searching or traveling by land, sea, air or space for the purpose of discovery of resources or information
Exploratory committee, in United States politics, an organization that tests the feasibility of a potential candidate running for an elected office
Exploratory data analysis, an approach to analyzing data for the purpose of formulating hypotheses worth testing
Exploratory engineering, the process of making models of systems that are not feasible with current technologies
 Exploratory (museum), a hands-on science museum in Bristol, England, from 1987 to 1999
Exploratory research, a type of research conducted for a problem that has not been clearly defined
Exploratory search a specialization of information exploration used by searchers who have difficulties with the domain or achieving their goal
Exploratory surgery, a surgery performed to find a diagnosis for an ailment, improvements in imaging technology have reduced their usage
Exploratory testing, an approach to software testing that is concisely described as simultaneous learning, test design and test execution
Space Solar Power Exploratory Research and Technology program, research conducted on the feasibility of solar power beamed from space